Nora Mead Brownell is the co-founder of Espy Energy Solutions, LLC, an energy consulting firm and a former Commissioner of the Federal Energy Regulatory Commission (FERC) from 2001–2006 under the administration of President George W. Bush. She is also the former President of the National Association of Regulatory Utility Commissioners (NARUC).

Career
In 1987, Brownell served as the Deputy Executive Assistant to Pennsylvania Governor Richard Thornburgh. Her career in energy began when she served as a Commissioner of the Pennsylvania Public Utility Commission (PUC) from 1997 to 2001. On April 30, 2001 President George W. Bush nominated Brownell to serve as a Commissioner for the Federal Energy Regulatory Commission. Her nomination was confirmed by the United States Senate a month later on May 25. She served until July 21, 2006. Following the conclusion of her term as a Commissioner with FERC, Brownell helped found the energy consulting firm, ESPY Energy Solutions, based in Alexandria, Virginia.

Brownell also served as the Board Chair for Pacific Gas and Electric.  She has been a Board Member for many corporations including National Grid, Spectra Energy, Oncor Electric Delivery, and Times Publishing Company. In addition, she has lectured at the University of Vermont Law School, Michigan State University, and the University of Idaho

Personal life
Brownell is a native of Erie, Pennsylvania and attended Syracuse University.

References

Living people
People from Erie, Pennsylvania
American women in business
Syracuse University alumni
Year of birth missing (living people)
American company founders
American women company founders
George W. Bush administration personnel
21st-century American women